For the other town in Virginia named Inglewood, see Inglewood, Rockingham County, Virginia.

Inglewood is an unincorporated community in Mecklenburg County, Virginia, United States.

The Goode plantation, named Inglewood, was the birthplace of the 19th-century politician William Goode in 1828.  He served in the Virginia state legislature and was elected as a member of the U.S. House of Representatives (1841–1843) and (1853–1859), when he died.

References

Unincorporated communities in Virginia
Unincorporated communities in Mecklenburg County, Virginia